Coastal artillery of the Dardanelles Strait are a series of redoubts on each side of the Dardanelles Strait which controlled the strait in the First World War during the Naval operations in the Dardanelles Campaign. Some castles located in the background also supported the coastal artillery.

Bouvet
The corporal Seyit Çabuk of the Rumeli Mecidiye artillery was responsible in sinking the French battleship Bouvet on 18 April 1915.

References

1915 in the Ottoman Empire
Naval battles of World War I involving the Ottoman Empire
Gallipoli campaign
Coastal artillery
Buildings and structures in Çanakkale Province
Buildings and structures of the Ottoman Empire
19th-century fortifications